Kharestan-e Sofla may refer to:
 Kharestan-e Sofla, Fars
 Kharestan-e Sofla, Khuzestan